Mihai Ciolacu (born September 11, 1977 in Constanța) is a former Romanian rugby union player. He played as a wing and also as a fly-half.

Club career
During his career, Ciolacu played mostly for Farul Constanța in Romania, and for a period of time for Albertville in France.

International career
Ciolacu gathered 10 caps for Romania, first in 1998 against Ukraine and the last one in 2001 against England. During his career, Ciolacu scored 2 tries and a conversion, 12 points on aggregate. He was a member of his national side for the 5th  Rugby World Cup in 1999.

Honours
Farul Constanța
 SuperLiga: 1996–97

References

External links
 
 
 

1977 births
Living people
Romanian rugby union players
Romania international rugby union players
Rugby union wings
Rugby union fly-halves
RCJ Farul Constanța players
Sportspeople from Constanța
Expatriate rugby union players in France